Ḥájí Mírzá Muḥammad Karím Khán-i-Kirmání (1810–1873), was a Shaykhi-Shia scholar. He was the third leader of Kermani Shaykhi community. After the death of his mentor, Sayyid Kazim Rashti, Kermani dedicated himself to the promotion of the teachings of Shaykh Ahmad and Sayyid Kazim. He is believed to be among the first Shaykhi scholars to have rejected the messianic claims of the Báb. He wrote a dozen of anti-Babi books, one such being Risāla izhāq al-bāṭil fī radd al-bābiyya (The Crushing of Falsehood in Refutation of Bābism).

Although he claimed to be nothing except an expositor of the teachings of Shaykh Ahmad and Sayyid Kazim, Kermani has to be considered an original thinker in his own right.

Further reading

 Emir Nosratedine Ghaffary (1965). Farah. L'Univers Paradiasiaque des Soufis Persans. Teheran. 1965.

References

Further reading 
 Chamankhah, L. (2021), Persianization of Shaykhīsm: The Doctrine of Rukn-i Rābiʿ from Aḥmad al-Aḥsāʾī to Karīm Khān Kirmānī. Muslim World, 111: 299-335. https://doi.org/10.1111/muwo.12405

1810 births
1873 deaths
Shaykhis
People from Kerman
People of Qajar Iran
19th-century Iranian writers